The J. Robert Oppenheimer Memorial Prize and Medal was awarded by the Center for Theoretical Studies, University of Miami, from 1969, until 1984. Established in memory of US physicist J. Robert Oppenheimer, the award consisted of a medal, certificate and a $1000 honorarium. It was awarded for "outstanding contributions to the theoretical natural sciences [...] during the preceding decade". The acceptance speech for the inaugural award to Dirac was published as The Development of Quantum Theory (1971).

Recipients
1969 – Paul Dirac
1970 – Freeman Dyson
1971 – Abdus Salam
1972 – Robert Serber
1973 – Steven Weinberg
1974 – Edwin Ernest Salpeter
1975 – Nicholas Kemmer
1976 – Yoichiro Nambu
1977 – Feza Gursey and Sheldon Glashow
1978 – Jocelyn Bell Burnell
1979 – Abraham Pais
1980 – Richard H. Dalitz
1981 – Frederick Reines
1982 – Maurice Goldhaber and Robert E. Marshak
1983 – Victor F. Weisskopf
1984 – John Archibald Wheeler

See also

 List of physics awards

References

Sources

Awards established in 1969
Physics awards